Chaos Ridden Years is a live album by Finnish melodic death metal band Children of Bodom. The release was released on Spinefarm Records both as a live album titled Chaos Ridden Years in October 2006, and the DVD version titled Stockholm Knockout Live - Chaos Ridden Years on 11 October 2006, directed by Patric Ullaeus.

General information 
The album is a live show from Arenan, Stockholm, Sweden and contains a documentary of the band, the making of the album, deleted scenes, a photo gallery, and seven promotional videos.

Laiho said in an interview with the Finnish music magazine Soundi that he did not want to record the DVD in Finland, because it was going to be an international release, and it would be ridiculous making speeches between the songs in English in the band's homeland Finland.

Track listing

CD & DVD
 Note: The track times listed are exclusive to the live album.

Disc 1:

Disc 2:

DVD only media
 Chaos Ridden Years: The Children of Bodom Documentary
 Making of Stockholm Knockout Live
 Deleted Scenes
 Photo Gallery
 Promotional Videos:
 "Are You Dead Yet?"
 "Downfall"
 "Deadnight Warrior"
 "Everytime I Die"
 "In Your Face"
 "Sixpounder"
 "Trashed, Lost & Strungout"

Release history

Charts

References

2006 live albums
2006 video albums
Children of Bodom albums
Live video albums
Spinefarm Records live albums